Giovanni Antonio d'Amato the younger (il giovane)  (c. 1535–1598) was an Italian painter of the Renaissance period, active mainly in his natal city of Naples.

Born to the brother of painter Giovanni Antonio d'Amato il vecchio; he married the painter Mariangiola Criscuolo. Upon his uncle's death, he entered the studio of Giovanni Bernardo Lama, also his uncle's pupil. He had two daughters and one son.

References

1530s births
1598 deaths
16th-century Neapolitan people
16th-century Italian painters
Italian male painters
Painters from Naples
Italian Mannerist painters